Shaposhnikov (Russian: Шапошников) is a Russian occupational masculine surname originating from the word shaposhnik, meaning hatter, its feminine counterpart is Shaposhnikova. The surname is known in Russia since at least 17th century and may refer to:

Adrian Shaposhnikov (1888–1967), Russian classical music composer
Aita Shaposhnikova (born 1957), Yakut translator and critic
Aleksei Shaposhnikov (1899–1962), Soviet football player
Aleksei Shaposhnikov (politician) (born 1973), Russian politician
Anna Shaposhnikova (born 1999), Russian handball player 
Boris Shaposhnikov (1882–1945), Soviet military commander in the interwar period
Leonid Shaposhnikov (born 1969), Ukrainian rower
Matvey Shaposhnikov (1906–1994), Soviet military commander
Natalia Shaposhnikova (born 1961), Russian artistic gymnast
Sergei Shaposhnikov (1923–2021), Russian football player and coach 
Tatyana Shaposhnikova (born 1946), Russian-born Swedish mathematician 
Yevgeny Shaposhnikov (1942−2020), last Minister of Defence of the Soviet Union

See also
Shaposhnik

References

Russian-language surnames
Occupational surnames
Patronymic surnames